Nawaf Shaker Fayrouz Al-Abed (born 26 January 1990) is a Saudi Arabian professional footballer who plays  as a winger for Al Shabab and the Saudi Arabia national team.

Club career

Al-Hilal

In 2009, Al-Hilal signed in Al-Abed from their youth academy. On 7 November, Nawaf scored the fastest goal in professional football against Al-Shoulla in two seconds in the Prince Faisal U-21 Cup, but the match was cancelled due to Al-Hilal making 6 player which are more than 21 years old play in the match.

On 9 March 2017, Al-Abed scored a third penalty goal against Ittihad and performed a celebration which made Ittihad fans furious. The Saudi Arabia FA banned him for two games, but Al-Hilal appealed and the ban was lifted.

International career
Al-Abed represented the Saudi Arabia national football team when his country hosted the 2014 Gulf Cup of Nations. His first international goal came in the quarter-final match with Yemen, becoming the winning goal as the Saudis prevailed 1–0. Nawaf scored again in the semi-final as Saudi Arabia defeated the United Arab Emirates 3–2. The Green Falcons eventually finished as runners-up to Qatar, losing 2–1 in the final at the King Fahd International Stadium.

Al-Abed was included in Saudi Arabia's squad for the 2015 AFC Asian Cup, scoring his third international goal in a 4–1 defeat of North Korea in the team's second group match.

In May 2018 he was named in Saudi Arabia's preliminary squad for the 2018 World Cup in Russia.

Career statistics

Club

International

International goals
Scores and results list Saudi Arabia's goal tally first.

Honours

Club
Al-Hilal
Saudi Professional League: 2009–10, 2010–11, 2016–17, 2017–18, 2019–20
King Cup of Champions: 2015, 2017
Saudi Crown Prince Cup: 2008–09, 2009–10, 2010–11, 2011–12, 2012–13, 2015–16
Saudi Super Cup: 2015, 2018
AFC Champions League: 2019

See also
Fastest goals in association football

References

External links
 Nawaf Al Abed - The official site of Al Hilal
 Nawaf Al Abed - Fastest soccer goal ever scored in 2 seconds

1990 births
Living people
Saudi Arabian footballers
Al Hilal SFC players
Al-Shabab FC (Riyadh) players
2011 AFC Asian Cup players
2015 AFC Asian Cup players
Saudi Arabia international footballers
Sportspeople from Riyadh
Association football midfielders
Saudi Professional League players
2022 FIFA World Cup players